John Paul "Poy" I. Erram (born July 7, 1989) is a Filipino professional basketball player for the TNT Tropang Giga of the Philippine Basketball Association (PBA). He was drafted 15th overall in 2013 by the Talk 'N Text Tropang Texters.

He started his career in Ateneo de Manila University (ADMU) where he played for the university's basketball team, the Ateneo Blue Eagles.

Professional career
On January 19, 2018 against the GlobalPort Batang Pier, Erram recorded a career-high 7 blocks in a 101–76 losing effort. Eight days later, Erram scored 14 points and grabbed a career-high 21 rebounds in a 84–88 loss to the Alaska Aces.

On January 21, 2019, Erram was named by the PBA Press Corps as the Defensive Player of the Year for the 2018 season after averaging a league-leading 1.9 blocks.

PBA career statistics

As of the end of 2021 season

Season-by-season averages

|-
| align=left | 
| align="left" |Blackwater
| 32 || 13.3 || .538 || .000 || .606 || 3.5 || .6 || .3 || .8 || 4.6
|-
| align=left | 
| align="left" |Blackwater
| 27 || 25.5 || .539 || .000 || .745 || 6.8 || 1.0 || .7 || 1.9 || 10.2
|-
| align=left | 
| align="left" |Blackwater
| 14 || 26.7 || .539 || .250 || .680 || 8.1 || .5 || .9 || 2.0 || 10.3
|-
| align=left | 
| align="left" |Blackwater
| 30 || 31.2 || .464 || .152 || .586 || 10.9 || 1.7 || .8 || 2.0 || 12.4
|-
| align=left | 
| align="left" |NLEX
| 33 || 25.8 || .474 || .302 || .623 || 8.2 || 1.8 || .5 || 2.1 || 11.7
|-
| align=left | 
| align=left | TNT
| 22 || 27.7 || .513 || .239 || .610 || 9.7 || 1.6 || .8 || 1.1 || 11.8
|-
| align=left | 
| align=left | TNT
| 36 || 20.1 || .470 || .286 || .708 || 6.4 || .9 || .3 || 1.2 || 8.4
|-class=sortbottom
| align=center colspan=2 | Career
| 194 || 23.8 || .495 || .260 || .642 || 7.5 || 1.2 || .5 || 1.5 || 9.7

References

1989 births
Living people
Blackwater Bossing players
Centers (basketball)
Filipino men's basketball players
Philippine Basketball Association All-Stars
Basketball players from Quezon City
Ateneo Blue Eagles men's basketball players
Philippines men's national basketball team players
Basketball players at the 2018 Asian Games
NLEX Road Warriors players
Asian Games competitors for the Philippines
TNT Tropang Giga players
TNT Tropang Giga draft picks